Aq Bash (also Romanized as Āq Bāsh and Āqbāsh; also known as Āgh Bāsh and Akbash) is a village in Sanjabad-e Shomali Rural District, in the Central District of Kowsar County, Ardabil Province, Iran. At the 2006 census, its population was 105, in 27 families.

References 

Tageo

Towns and villages in Kowsar County